Chen Mu (d. 75) was a governor and general during the Han Dynasty who served the first Protector General of the Western Regions under Eastern Han between 74–75. During his service, he was killed by the rebels in Karasahr in A.D. 75, during the Han-Xiongnu War.

See also
Battle of Yiwulu

References

Fan Ye et al., Hou Hanshu. Beijing: Zhonghua Shuju, 1965. 
Sima Guang, comp. Zizhi Tongjian. Beijing: Zhonghua Shuju, 1956.

75 deaths
Han dynasty generals
Year of birth unknown